Łukasz Maria Abgarowicz  (born 18 October 1949 in Bydgoszcz) is a Polish politician.

He graduated from the Veterinary Technical Faculty of the Warsaw University of Life Sciences in 1972 and worked as a race horse trainer at Warsaw State Horse Race Tracks between 1972 and 1988. From 1988 to 1990, he was the corporate development representative of the board of directors of the Inar Company in Warsaw and served as chairman of the board of directors of the Warnet Company (until 1999). Between 1999 and 2002 he was the chairman of the supervisory board of Dom Development Company S.A.

He was a member of the Sejm from 2001 to 2005 representing the 16th Płock district, from the Civic Platform list. He has been a Senator since 2007 and is a member of the national council of the Civic Platform Party of Poland.

He has five children.

See also
 Members of Polish Sejm 2005-2007

External links
 Łukasz Maria Abgarowicz - parliamentary page - includes declarations of interest, voting record, and transcripts of speeches.

References 

1949 births
Living people
Politicians from Bydgoszcz
Polish people of Armenian descent
Members of the Polish Sejm 2005–2007
Members of the Polish Sejm 2001–2005
Civic Platform politicians
Members of the Senate of Poland 2007–2011
Members of the Senate of Poland 2011–2015